The Roman Catholic Archdiocese of Belo Horizonte is an archdiocese located in the city of Belo Horizonte in Brazil.

History
 February 11, 1921: Established as Diocese of Belo Horizonte from the Metropolitan Archdiocese of Mariana.
 February 1, 1924: Promoted as Metropolitan Archdiocese of Belo Horizonte.

Special churches

Minor Basilicas:

Basílica de São João Maria Vianney.
 Basílica Nossa Senhora de Lourdes.
Basílica Estadual Nossa Senhora da Piedade. (small church)
Basílica Estadual das Romarias. (major church)
Our Lady of Good Voyage Archdiocesan Sanctuary, Belo Horizonte
Our Lady of Mercy Stadual Sanctuary

World Heritage Church: UNESCO World Heritage Site (as part of the Pampulha Modern Ensemble)

Church of Saint Francis of Assisi, Pampulha

Leadership
Bishops of Belo Horizonte: (Roman rite)

 Archbishop Antônio dos Santos Cabral (1921.11.21 – 1924.02.01)

Archbishops of Belo Horizonte: (Roman rite)

 Archbishop Antônio dos Santos Cabral (1924.02.01 – 1967.11.15)
 Archbishop João Resende Costa, S.D.B. (1967.11.15 – 1986.02.05)
Serafim Cardeal Fernandes de Araújo (1986.02.05 – 2004.01.28)
 Archbishop Walmor Oliveira de Azevedo (2004.01.28 – present)

Other affiliated bishops

Coadjutor archbishops
Hugo Bressane de Araújo (1951-1954), did not succeed to the see; appointed Archbishop (Personal Title) of Marília, São Paulo
João Resende (Rezende) Costa, S.D.B. (1957-1967)
Serafim Fernandes de Araújo (1982-1986); future Cardinal

Auxiliary bishops
Geraldo María de Morais Penido (1956-1957), appointed Coadjutor Bishop of Juiz de Fora
Serafim Fernandes de Araújo (1959-1982), appointed Coadjutor here; future Cardinal
José Dalvit, F.S.C.J. (1973-1977)
Arnaldo Ribeiro (1975-1988), appointed Archbishop of Ribeirão Preto, São Paulo
Werner Franz Siebenbrock, S.V.D. (1988-1994), appointed Bishop of Nova Iguaçu, Rio de Janeiro
Sebastião Roque Rabelo Mendes (1989-2004)
David Dias Pimentel (1996-2001), appointed Bishop of São João da Boa Vista, São Paulo
Décio Sossai Zandonade, S.D.B. (1996-2003), appointed Bishop of Colatina, Espirito Santo
Joaquim Giovanni Mol Guimarães (2006-
Aloísio Jorge Pena Vitral (2006-2009), appointed Bishop of Teófilo Otoni, Minas Gerais
Wilson Luís Angotti Filho (2011-2015), appointed Bishop of Taubaté, São Paulo
Luis Gonzaga Féchio (2011-2016), appointed Bishop of Amparo, São Paulo
João Justino de Medeiros Silva (2011-2017), appointed Coadjutor Archbishop of Montes Claros, Minas Gerais
Edson José Oriolo dos Santos (2015-2019), appointed Bishop of Leopoldina, Minas Gerais
Geovane Luís da Silva (2016-
Otacilio Francisco Ferreira de Lacerda (2016-2019), appointed Bishop of Guanhães, Minas Gerais
Vicente de Paula Ferreira, C.SS.R. (2017-
Nivaldo dos Santos Ferreira (2020-
Júlio César Gomes Moreira (2020-

Other priests of this diocese who became bishops
Alexandre Gonçalves do Amaral, appointed Bishop of Uberaba in 1939
Alberto Taveira Corrêa, appointed Auxiliary Bishop of Brasília, Distrito Federal in 1991

Suffragan dioceses
 Diocese of Divinópolis 
 Diocese of Luz
 Diocese of Oliveira
 Diocese of Sete Lagoas

References

Sources
 GCatholic.org
 Catholic Hierarchy
  Diocese website

Roman Catholic dioceses in Brazil
Roman Catholic ecclesiastical provinces in Brazil
 
Christian organizations established in 1921
Roman Catholic dioceses and prelatures established in the 20th century
1921 establishments in Brazil